William Seward Webb (January 31, 1851 – October 29, 1926) was a businessman, and inspector general of the Vermont militia with the rank of colonel. He was a founder and former president of the Sons of the American Revolution.

Early life
Webb was born on January 31, 1851, to James Watson Webb and Laura Virginia (née Cram) Webb (1826–1890).  Among his many siblings was Alexander Stewart Webb, who was a noted Civil War general who married Anna Elizabeth Remsen; Henry Walter Webb, also a railway executive who married Amelia Howard Griswold; and George Creighton Webb, a Yale Law School graduate and attorney in New York with Saunders, Webb & Worcester who did not marry.

He studied medicine in Vienna, Paris and Berlin. Returning to America, he entered the Columbia University College of Physicians and Surgeons and graduated from there in 1875.  In 1881, he married Eliza Osgood Vanderbilt, the daughter of William Henry Vanderbilt. For several years Webb practiced medicine; then forsook the profession for finance at the behest of his wife's family, establishing the Wall Street firm of W. S. Webb & Co.

Career
In 1883, Webster Wagner, the president of the Wagner Palace Car Company, was crushed between two of his own railroad cars. William Vanderbilt owned a controlling interest in the company, and asked his new son-in-law to take over the firm. William Seward invited his brother H. Walter Webb to join him, which started them both on careers in the railroad business. The Wagner Palace Car Company was subsequently merged with the Pullman Company.

Webb later became president of the Fulton Chain Railway Company, the Fulton Navigation Company and the Raquette Lake Transportation Company. He was the builder and President of the Mohawk and Malone Railway.  His railroads were instrumental in opening the Adirondacks to the tourism rush of the mid-to-late 19th century and beyond.

Public service
Webb served as inspector general of rifle practice for the Vermont militia with the rank of colonel.  A Republican, he won election to the Vermont House of Representatives in 1896 and 1898.

In 1902, he intended to campaign for the Republican nomination for Governor of Vermont, but left the race in favor of Percival Clement.  Clement lost the nomination to John G. McCullough, who went on to win the general election.

Personal life

In 1883, he married Eliza Osgood Vanderbilt, daughter of railroad magnate William H. Vanderbilt. They were the parents of:

 Frederica Webb, who married Ralph Pulitzer.
 J. Watson Webb II, who married Electra Havemeyer Webb.
 William Seward Webb, who married Gertrude Emily Gaynor, daughter of William Jay Gaynor; had issue.
 Vanderbilt Webb, who married Aileen Osborn.

He died on October 29, 1926, and was survived by his wife, three sons, and one daughter.

Legacy
The Webbs lived for thirty years at 680 Fifth Avenue, New York. This house, a wedding gift from William H. Vanderbilt to his daughter, was sold in 1913 to John D. Rockefeller. The Webb property at Shelburne, Vermont, was created from more than thirty separate farms on the shores of Lake Champlain and is known today as Shelburne Farms. The property is a National Historic Landmark, and one of the main concert sites of the Vermont Mozart Festival.  The former Webb estate has stunning views and some of the grandest barns of any Gilded Age property.

A great horseman, Dr. Webb had a large collection of carriages, many of which are on display today at the Shelburne Museum. The Vanderbilt Webb's other country estate was an Adirondack Great Camp named NeHaSane, a game preserve of some 200,000 acres (800 km²), most of which was later donated to the State of New York to become part of the Adirondack Park. The town of Webb, New York in the park is named after him.

Published works
California and Alaska and over the Canadian Pacific Railway (1890)
Historical notes of the organization of societies of sons of the American Revolution, with a list of national and state officers, and illustrated with designs showing the insignia of the order, form of application for membership, certificates, etc. (1890)
Shelburne Farms Stud: of English Hackneys, harness and saddle horses, ponies and trotters (1893)

References

External links 
 
 
Online Biography at Rootsweb.com
 History of Shelburne Farms
 Shelburne Museum website.
 Reynolds, Cuyler, ed., Genealogical and Family History of Southern New York, New York:Lewis Historical Publishing Company, 1914, v. 3

19th-century American railroad executives
Columbia University Vagelos College of Physicians and Surgeons alumni
People from Shelburne, Vermont
Sons of the American Revolution
Republican Party members of the Vermont House of Representatives
Vanderbilt family
1926 deaths
1851 births
General Society of Colonial Wars
People included in New York Society's Four Hundred
Vermont National Guard personnel